Berezniki, is the second largest city in Perm Krai, Russia. The city is located on the banks of the Kama River, in the Ural Mountains with a population of 137,091 as of 2021.

Etymology 
The name Berezniki is derived from a birch forest originally situated in the city's location.

History 
The first Russian settlements in the city appeared in the 16th - 17th century on the basis of salt mines.

It was founded in 1873. City status was granted to it in 1932 as its industry was rapidly expanding under Joseph Stalin.

Administrative and municipal status 
Within the framework of administrative divisions, it is incorporated as the city of krai significance of Berezniki—an administrative unit with the status equal to that of the districts. As a municipal division, the city of krai significance of Berezniki is incorporated as Berezniki Urban Okrug.

Economy 
After the dissolution of the Soviet Union in 1991, the city's population dropped due to increased unemployment. Nevertheless, the city was able to keep its main industries on track. Large chemical plants such as titanium and sodium factories as well as several huge potassium, magnesium and potash mines are operational in Berezniki.

The potash mine, owned by Uralkali, was the basis of the fortune of Dmitry Rybolovlev who sold his interest in 2010 to Suleyman Kerimov. Mine supports in the huge underground mine, about 1,000 feet (~300 metres) beneath the city, consist of soluble salt which is being dissolved by water flooding into the mine. The city, a former Soviet-era labor camp, was built near the work site, over the mine. Several sinkholes, some huge, have opened within the city. The situation requires round-the-clock monitoring. The problem is believed to be limited to a small part of the mine which was not filled properly and is limited in its future impact, but the relocation of the city is under consideration. The largest sinkhole, locally dubbed, "The Grandfather" by 2012, was 340 yards (~310 metres) wide, 430 yards (~390 metres) long, and 780 feet (~240 metres) deep. When it opened in 2007 the hole was initially 80 m long, 40 m wide and 200 m deep. The sinkhole was expected to expand, and destroy part of the only rail line which leads to and from the potash mines, and, being that Berezniki produces around 10% of the world's potash, this would lead global demand towards Canada, potentially damaging the local economy. Nobody was injured when the sinkhole appeared.

Culture 
Berezniki has a theatre and a museum of regional history.

Every year from July 17 to the 20th the town celebrates its mosquitoes.  They have music, dancing and a "most delicious girl" competition.  In the competition, the girls stand for 20 minutes in their shorts and vests, and the one who receives the most bites wins.

Population 

The city was in 124th place out of 1115 cities of Russia in terms of population in 2019.

According to the 2010 census, Russians formed a majority in the city with a 90.87%, while Tatars (3.16%) were the largest minority, followed by Ukrainians (0.81%), Permian Komi (0.67%) and Germans (0.51%).

Notable people 
 Vasily Pavlovich Boryagin, Hero of Socialist Labor
 Dmitry Rybolovlev, Russian billionaire, controlled the leading Berezniki potash mines from 2000 — 2011
 Boris Yeltsin, Russia's first president, attended Pushkin High School in Berezniki

Transportation
Berezniki is served by the Berezniki Airport, which mainly serves helicopters. A railway station is closed since it is located in the sinkhole area and has been damaged beyond repair. In the city, public transport service is operated with trolleybuses.

Gallery

References

Sources

Further reading 
 "A Russian City Always on the Watch Against Being Sucked Into the Earth" article by Andrew E. Kramer in The New York Times April 10, 2012

External links 
 Official website of Berezniki 
 Berezniki Business Directory 
 Pictures of Berezniki

Cities and towns in Perm Krai
Cities and towns built in the Soviet Union
Populated places established in 1932
Populated places on the Kama River